{{DISPLAYTITLE:C11H13NO4}}
The molecular formula C11H13NO4 (molar mass: 223.23 g/mol, exact mass: 223.0845 u) may refer to:

 Bendiocarb
 Diethyl lutidinate
 Mephenoxalone

Molecular formulas